Nikita Sergeyevich Khrushchev can refer to: 

 Nikita Khrushchev, First Secretary of the Communist Party of the Soviet Union
 Nikita Khrushchev (journalist), grandson of  the First Secretary of the Communist Party of the Soviet Union